AS-19 is a substance which acts as a potent agonist at the 5-HT7 receptor, with an IC50 of 0.83nM. It reverses the amnesia induced by drugs such as scopolamine and dizocilpine and improves long-term memory acquisition, but inhibits short-term memory formation.

See also 
 E-55888
 LP-12
 LP-44
 LP-211

References 

5-HT7 agonists
Pyrazoles
Dimethylamino compounds
Aminotetralins